Salaheddine Icharane is a Moroccan professional footballer who plays as a forward.
His first year in the super Moroccan league scored one goal and two goals in the Moroccan cup.
He has become the favorite around his teammates for this season among the others.

References

Living people
1997 births
Moroccan footballers
Association football forwards
SCC Mohammédia players